The Greater Romania Party (PRM) is a Romanian nationalist political party. Founded in May 1991 by Eugen Barbu and Corneliu Vadim Tudor, it was led by the latter from that point until his death in September 2015. The party is sometimes referred to in English as the Great Romania Party.

It briefly participated in government from 1993 to 1995 (in Nicolae Văcăroiu's cabinet). In 2000, Tudor received the second largest number of votes in Romania's presidential elections, partially as a result of protest votes lodged by Romanians frustrated with the fractionalisation and mixed performance of the 1996–2000 Romanian Democratic Convention (CDR) government. Tudor's second-place position ensured he would compete in the second round run-off against former president and Party of Social Democracy in Romania (PDSR) candidate Ion Iliescu, who won by a large margin. Parallels are often drawn with the situation in France two years later, when far-right National Rally (RN) party leader Jean-Marie Le Pen similarly drew the second largest number of votes and was elevated, but nevertheless defeated, in the presidential run-off against Jacques Chirac.

Although Tudor clearly remained the central figure in the PRM, in March 2005 he briefly stepped down from the party presidency in favour of Corneliu Ciontu. A primary objective of the move was to provide the appearance of a shift toward the political center and to attempt to align PRM with the European People's Party (EPP) bloc in the European Parliament. During this period the PRM also briefly changed its name to the Greater Romania's People Party. EPP, however, rejected the PRM as a potential member. Tudor stated he refused to join the EPP because of its lack of identity. In June 2005, Tudor asserted that he had decided the new leadership had distanced itself from the founding principles of the party, and he sacked the new leadership and reverted the party's name back to simply the "Greater Romania Party". In November 2005, Ciontu, along with a small faction of the PRM, formed their own party, the People's Party (PP), which has since merged with the New Generation Party (PNG).

In January 2007, with Romania's accession to the EU România Mare's five MEPs joined a group of far-right parties in the European Parliament that included the French National Rally (RN) and Austrian Freedom Party (FPÖ), giving them sufficient numbers to form an official bloc, called Identity, Tradition, Sovereignty. Though due to disagreements, they left the group a few months later, causing its collapse.

History and ideology

The party was founded in 1991 by Tudor, who was formerly known as a "court poet" of communist dictator Nicolae Ceaușescu, and his literary mentor, the writer Eugen Barbu, one year after Tudor launched the România Mare weekly magazine, which remains the most important propaganda tool of the PRM. Tudor subsequently launched a companion daily newspaper called Tricolorul or Ziarul Tricolorul. (The historical expression Greater Romania refers to the idea of recreating the former Kingdom of Romania which existed during the interwar period. Having been the largest entity to bear the name of Romania, the frontiers were marked with the intent of uniting most territories inhabited by ethnic Romanians into a single country; and it is now a rallying cry for Romanian nationalists. Due to internal conditions under Communism after World War II, the expression's use was forbidden in publications until 1990, after the Romanian Revolution.) The party's initial success was partly attributed to the deep rootedness of Ceaușescu's national communism in Romania.

Both the ideology and the main political focus of the Greater Romania Party (PRM) are reflected in frequently strongly nationalistic articles written by Tudor. The party has called for the outlawing of the ethnic Hungarian party, the Democratic Alliance of Hungarians in Romania (UDMR), for allegedly plotting the secession of Transylvania.

PRM promotes the idea of a "Greater Romania" that would bring together all the territories populated by Romanians in neighboring countries (Ukraine and Moldova). It especially calls for the annexation of Moldova.

The party has praised and shown nostalgia for both the military dictatorship of Axis ally Ion Antonescu, whom they consider a hero or even a saint, and the communist regime of Ceaușescu. The party rejected the 2006 Tismăneanu report on the communist dictatorship in Romania as a manipulation of history.

In 2003, Tudor said he would no longer engage in discourse against Jews and Judaism or deny the Holocaust (see Corneliu Vadim Tudor). He also said that he had become, in his own words, a "philo-Semite". In subsequent months he and some of his supporters travelled to Poland to visit the Auschwitz concentration camp; and, despite strong objections from the family of slain Israeli Prime Minister Yitzhak Rabin and many Jewish organisations, Tudor illegally erected a statue in memory of Rabin in the city of Braşov (for which he was found guilty and fined). During this period, Tudor hired Nati Meir, a Jewish advisor, who ran and won as a PRM candidate for the Romanian Chamber of Deputies. Tudor also hired an Israeli public relations firm, Arad Communications, to run his campaign.

Party leaders
 Corneliu Vadim Tudor (1991–2015)
 Emil Străinu (2015–2016)
 Victor Iovici (2017–present)

Electoral history

Legislative elections

Local elections

Presidential elections

European elections 

Notes:

1 PNG-CD competed on PRM ballot, thus gaining 1 MEP.

References

External links
 Greater Romania Party
 România Mare (magazine) 
 Tricolorul (magazine) 

1991 establishments in Romania
Anti-Hungarian sentiment in Romania
Political parties with anti-Hungarian sentiment
Eastern Orthodox political parties
Euronat members
Eurosceptic parties in Romania
Far-right political parties in Romania
Romanian irredentism
National conservative parties
Nationalist parties in Romania
Political parties established in 1991
Registered political parties in Romania
Right-wing populism in Romania
Right-wing populist parties
Romanian nationalist parties